Puthur is a census town in Kasaragod district in the Indian state of Kerala. Puthur is a suburb of Kasaragod city.

Demographics
As of 2011 Census, Puthur had a population of 14,271 with 6,749 males and 7,522 females. The average sex ratio was 1114 higher than the state average of 1084. 14.4% of the population was under 6 years of age. Puthur had average literacy of 89.75% higher than the national average of 74.04% and lower than state average of 94.00%; male literacy was 93.87% and female literacy was 86.14%.

Religions
As of 2011 census, Puthur census town had total population of 14,271 among which 70.8% are Muslims, 28.6% Hindus, 0.5% Christians and 0.1% Others.

Administration
Puthur is part of Mogral Puthur Grama Panchayat in Kasaragod Block. This area comes under Kasaragod Assembly constituency which is part of Kasaragod Loksabha.

References

Suburbs of Kasaragod
Cities and towns in Kasaragod district